Frederick Houghton Milnes (26 January 1878 – 1946) was an English footballer who played in the Football League for Leicester Fosse and Sheffield United.

Career
Milnes was born in Wortley, South Yorkshire and was the son of a wealthy steel company executive. He refused to sign professional contracts with club's and only signed on amateur forms which allowed him to move freely around the country and play for England national amateur team. He set up his own amateur touring team The Pilgrims F.C. which spent most of their time playing in the United States.

References

1878 births
1946 deaths
English footballers
Association football defenders
English Football League players
Sheffield F.C. players
Sheffield United F.C. players
West Ham United F.C. players
Tottenham Hotspur F.C. players
Manchester United F.C. players
Reading F.C. players
Leicester City F.C. players
Northern Nomads F.C. players
Ilford F.C. players
Norwich City F.C. players